Martinvelle is a commune in the Vosges department in Grand Est in northeastern France.

Inhabitants are called Martinvillois.

Geography
The commune lies on the southwest of the Vôge Plateau and at the edge of the department, beside the adjacent Haute-Saône department.   The northern part of the commune is within the Forest of Darney.

The intersection of the 48th parallel north with the 6th meridian east lies within the commune.

History
The village's history is more linked with that of the adjacent Franche-Comté than that of Lorraine.   Until the revolution the lords of Passavant ruled here.

The coat of arms includes images of an oak leaf and of a mechanical hay rake, reflecting the importance here both of the forest and of agriculture, and recalling the factory that manufactured agricultural implements locally between 1860 and 1962.

See also
Communes of the Vosges department

References

Communes of Vosges (department)